Homeless Hare is a 1950 Warner Bros. Merrie Melodies cartoon short directed by Chuck Jones. The short was released on March 11, 1950, and stars Bugs Bunny. Some television broadcasts omit the shot of Bugs dropping a brick on Hercules' head. The Blue Ribbon release also removed the shorts original Bugs Bunny in card, joining only Hot Cross Bunny, Knights Must Fall & Rabbit Hood in this distinction.

Plot
Bugs wakes up after a long night to find that a burly construction worker has just shoveled up his rabbit hole near a highrise building being built. Bugs kindly asks Hercules to put his hole back, and Hercules pretends to comply, before he dumps Bugs and the dirt into the dump truck. Bugs angrily shouts "Hey, you big gorilla! Didn't you ever hear of the sanctity of the American home?" before another mound of earth falls on him and the truck hauls him away.

When Hercules exits the crane, Bugs calls him from the building under construction dropping a brick on him (with a telegram saying "Okay Hercules, you asked for it!"), then a steel girder, and then plays with the elevator controls while Hercules is inside the elevator. He accidentally breaks the controls, causing the elevator to fly off, and Hercules to fall into a pile of wet concrete.

Bugs then impersonates the project engineer and orders Hercules to make a high brick wall, followed by several attachments. Once done, Hercules is trapped at dizzying heights on a teeterboard. As Bugs removes the bricks from one end, Hercules on the other end strips off his clothes to save weight. This only works temporarily; by the time Bugs removes the last brick, Hercules is down to nothing but his underwear.

Hercules takes the fall, but suddenly manages to knock Bugs out temporarily with a steel girder, causing Bugs to dumbly "sleepwalk" through a harrowing series of moving girders and other objects. He finally regains his senses when he falls into a barrel full of water, then witnesses his nemesis bullying a shy employee, swiping his lunch and ordering him back to work. Infuriated, Bugs decides to put the goon out of commission once and for all. Appropriating a red-hot rivet with pliers, Bugs takes a look at the posted floor plans for the building and finds his mark. He releases the rivet down a hole; it bounces around through an elaborate maze of objects and finally lands and burns through a rope holding up a giant steel casing which falls on top of Hercules. Bugs' ultimatum: "Do I get my home back or do I have to get tough?" prompts Hercules to finally wave the white flag in defeat.  The next shot is of the finished skyscraper, with a slight indentation in the middle. At the bottom, Bugs sits in his hole - the building has been built around it - and declares: "After all, a man's home is his castle."

See also
List of Bugs Bunny cartoons
No Parking Hare - a remake of this cartoon in 1954

References

External links

 

1950 films
1950 animated films
1950 short films
Merrie Melodies short films
Short films directed by Chuck Jones
Films about real estate holdout
Films scored by Carl Stalling
Warner Bros. Cartoons animated short films
Bugs Bunny films
1950s Warner Bros. animated short films
Films with screenplays by Michael Maltese
1950s English-language films